In particle physics, heptaquarks are a family of hypothetical composite particles, each consisting of seven quarks or antiquarks of any flavours.

Properties
One model predicts that the lowest-energy heptaquark state would be a spin-1/2 or spin-3/2 state of energy roughly 2.5 GeV. Another study found that the most stable heptaquark would include three strange quarks and two strange antiquarks.

See also
Exotic baryon

References

Baryons
Hypothetical composite particles